A Sanskrit Dictionary gives more than eighty meanings of the Sanskrit word, Sthiti (स्थिति), but this word mainly refers to position, rank or dignity, staying, or permanence, permanent or continued existence in any place.

Hindu interpretations

Vedic interpretation
The single principle behind the universe is described by Atharvaveda in Mantra X.8.11 in the following words:

यदेजति पतति यच्च तिष्ठति प्राणदप्राणन्निमिषच्च यद् भुवत् |
तद् दाधार पृथिवीं विश्वरूपं तत् सं भूय भवत्येकमेव ||

as the one reality existing which possessing multifarious forms and qualities upholds this world that has resting on it whatever which desires to move or fly or stay stationary which breathes or does not breath, which sees and does not see.

According to the Shatapatha Brahmana, the word, Sthiti, refers to maintenance, of the created world, the life-giver, duration of life of the maintenance of universal creation, and according to Sri Brahma Samhita, it refers to preservation.

Yoga school’s interpretation
The Vastu-sutra Upanishad with reference to Kriyavastha ('rituals of postural action') speaks of six essential disciplines that can be applied to Asana; the language of postures refers to three rhythms – Shrishti ('emanation'), Sthiti ('maintenance') and Samhara ('resorption'). Vaijayanti Kosha defines Sthiti as the act of maintaining. Sthiti relates to adulthood and emphasizes organic and pranic actions.

As per Yoga terminology, the word, Sthiti, means 'steadiness' i.e. steadiness of the mind –

तत्र स्थितौ यत्रोऽभ्यासः ||

"Of these two, abhyās, practice, is the effort to develop steadiness" - (Yoga Sutra 13)

Samadhi is the highest Sthiti of mind.

Yoga school recommends exercises to be practiced in accordance with one’s physical condition, age and constitution; the general rule is to follow vriddhi (during youth when the body is healthy and growing), sthiti (during middle age when the body is neither growing nor decaying) and laya (during old age when the body gets old and is decaying). The different asana ('postures'), which are duly graded, are also called sthiti. Moreover, absence of commonly experienced states of mental distraction known as citta vritti is called sthiti ('stationary') or absolute tranquility, in that state one experiences prasanta-vahita ('flow of peace'); and in which state the yogi desires to remain continuously. According to Yoga Rahasya, Sthiti is a karma meant for the house-holder, and Sthiti means – to stay i.e. the priority to maintain health rather than increase strength.

Vaishnava interpretation
According to Vaishnava Dharma, the five functions of Shakti are triodhana or triobhava ('delusion'), shrishti ('creation'), sthiti ('sustenance'), laya or samhrti ('dissolution') and anugraha ('grace'); these account for its Kiryashakti ('power of action'). Avyakta, aksara, yoni, avidya, trigunas, sthiti, maya, svabhava etc., are synonyms of Prakrti.

Yoga Vasistha has six prakarnas ('divisions') – vairagya ('renunciation'), mumuksu-vyavahara ('longing for salvation'), utpatti ('cosmological origin'), sthiti ('preservation'), upasama ('quiescence') and nirvana ('absorption'). The five stories in Sthiti Prakarna narrated by Rishi Vashistha, show that by forgetting that the actor, the perceiver, the knower or "I" is one's own creation identifying with action, and by identifying with the actor, the perceived and the known, one becomes totally bound and suffers repeated births. Sthiti or preservation of the "I" is important for growth when one learns and experiences the different aspects of existence.

Shaiva interpretation
The five activities attributed to Ishvara by the Shaivites are – shrishti ('emanation or projection'), sthiti ('maintenance'), samhara ('withdrawal'), vilaya ('concealment of the real nature') and anugraha ('grace'), and therefore, Shiva is known as pancakrityakari, the continuous do-er of five-fold act which is different from the concept of Brahman who is niskriya ('without activity'). Pratayabhijna insists on meditation on panca-krtya and the practice of vikalpa-ksaya during which course the retention and enjoyment of what one perceives (abhasana) is rakti or sthiti i.e. preservation, which is withdrawn at the time of knowledge. Sthiti is thus the inward cessation of all darsanas ('empirical knowledge, the experience of things').

The Devi-Bhagavata III.7.25-26 speaks of the three shaktis of the three gunas – jnana-shakti of sattva, kriya-shakti of rajas and artha-shakti or dravya-shakti of tamas; jnana and dravya show the nature of prakasa ('light', 'knowledge') and sthiti ('sustenance', 'existence') in a clearer way. Shrishti (natural state and Nature), Sthiti (continuation and maintenance) and Samhara (annihilation and reabsorption) constitute the triad which alludes to a ceaseless process of creation, sustenance and dissolution in a repeating cycle starting from the emptiness of a positive content which causes multifarious forms to shine forth in the mid-way of its movement before receding to rest from where the process started. Sthiti is defined as that by virtue of which the gunas are recognized as gunas, and is the common name of the other two genders viz. birth and death.

Jaina interpretation
In Jainism, the word, Sthiti, refers to the length or duration (in time) of ayu-karma, the specific period for which the karmic matter, consisting of desires or passions that motivate actions, remains bound with the soul, where the specific length of life in the gati, whether as a heavenly being or a hell being, is determined by the sthiti of ayu that stays bound; bhava-leshya affects sthiti and pradesa-bandha. The duration of karmans of a Jiva is dependent on adhayavasaya ('the tenure of the mind'), and therefore, on the strength of the kasayas ('binding factors').

Buddhist interpretation
Abhidharma-kosa, a Buddhist text, in Sloka II.46 tells us that – "Arising is existence following upon non-existence; duration is the series; impermanence is the rupture of all series; and between the successive states of the series"; in Buddhism sthiti refers to the impermanence of duration; it is the impermanence of duration that destroys dharma The Sarvastivadins, as a result of the analysis of change, commute impermanence in terms of jati ('nascent'), sthiti ('static'), jara ('decaying') and nasa ('cessant') moments taking "change of what exists" as signifying two moments, static and decaying. The followers of Theravada reject the jara-moment, and the Sautrantikas reject the sthiti-moment.

References

Hindu philosophical concepts
Jain philosophy
Buddhist philosophical concepts
Vaishnavism
Vedas
Sanskrit words and phrases